Viator of Lyons (died ) is a Gaul saint of the fourth century.

History
The name "Viator" in Latin originally meant "traveller by road". In Roman law, the word came to designate a minor court official who went out to summon people to appear before the magistrate. This might have been Viator's prior occupation, or refer to his family of origin. According to tradition, he was a lector or a catechist at the cathedral of Lyons, and was held in high esteem by the bishop of Lyons, Justus (Just), and by the congregants. Around 381 Justus decided to live as a hermit in Egypt and Viator knowing his intentions, decided to follow his bishop and master. He caught up with the bishop at Marseilles, and together they boarded ship for Egypt. They died at a monastery of Scetes (present-day Wadi El Natrun) in AD 389.

Veneration
Their relics were translated to Lyon (the day is recorded as September 2). By the fifth century four feast days were celebrated annually in Lyon in honor of Sts Just and Viator. Their remains lie in the church of St. Just in Lyon.

His feast day is October 21.

Legacy
The Clerics of Saint Viator take their name from him.

St Just of Lyon

Just was born in Vivarais and became a deacon of the Church of Vienne. Sometime after 343, he was chosen to succeed Bishop Verissimus, as bishop of Lyons.   In 374, Bishop Just assisted at regional Council at Valence. In 382, he attended the Council of Aquileia, as one of the two representatives of the Bishops of Gaul.

Shortly after returning from the Council of Aquileia, Bishop Just confided to Viator intention to abandon the See of Lyons in order to take up the ascetical life a monk in the desert of Scete in Egypt. This decision seems to have motivated by a number of factors: his character, that of a mild studious and contemplative man; his age, for he had been a bishop many years and it seems he was already in his sixties; and by a sad event which had occurred in Lyons a short time before.

A mad man had raced through the market place of the city, slashing wildly with a sword, and wounding and killing many citizens. He then dashed to the Cathedral and claimed the right of sanctuary. A mob gathered to storm the church. Bishop Just intervened, but on being assured that the man would be given a fair trial he agreed to hand the man over. No sooner had this been done, than the mob seized the man from the magistrate's guard, and killed him on the spot. The bishop came to believe that his failure to adequately protect the murderer had made him unworthy to continue to lead the Christian community, and he resolved to devote the remainder of his life to doing penance.

In 381 Bishop Just secretly left Lyons for Marseilles, where he took ship for Alexandria in Egypt. Once there, they joined the community of monks in the desert of Scetes, about 40 or 50 miles south of Alexandria, beyond the mountains of Nitria, in the Libyan Desert. At that time the leader or abbot of this community was St. Macarius of Egypt (or the Elder) († 390), a disciple of one of the founders of monasticism in Egypt, St. Anthony († 356). Macarius had a reputation for great holiness and a fierce asceticism. Most of the monks lived in cells, either dug in the ground or built of stones, and each out of sight of others. They came together only on Saturdays to celebrate the liturgy. They supported themselves by manual labor, and ate only the poorest of foods. Fasting, prayer, silence, and the keeping of night vigils, characterized their lives. Bishop Just died around 389.

References

External links
The Clerics of Saint Viator
Viator of Lyons

390s deaths
Roman Catholic deacons
French hermits
Gallo-Roman saints
4th-century Christian saints
Year of birth unknown
Year of death missing